T. Greg Doucette is an American lawyer best known for indexing videos of police brutality. He originally compiled the videos in a Twitter thread and received thousands of submissions via direct message. Mathematician Jason Miller began a public spreadsheet to track the content.

He ran as a Republican in District 22 of the North Carolina State Senate in 2016, but lost to the Democratic incumbent Mike Woodward.

References

Further reading

External links 

 
 Spreadsheet of police brutality videos

American lawyers
Crowdsourcing
People from Durham, North Carolina
Police brutality in the United States
Year of birth missing (living people)
Living people
Washington (state) Republicans